This is a list of electoral results for the Electoral district of Pascoe Vale in Victorian state elections.

Members for Pascoe Vale

Election results

Elections in the 2020s

Elections in the 2010s

Elections in the 2000s

Elections in the 1990s

Elections in the 1980s

Elections in the 1950s

References

 

Victoria (Australia) state electoral results by district